Jean-Pierre Poccioni (born 1948) is a French writer, whose first novel, Le Beau Désordre, was published in 2000.

In January 2006, he published La Maison du Faune.

References

1948 births
Living people
French male writers
Place of birth missing (living people)
Date of birth missing (living people)